Șerban Vodă Cemetery (commonly known as Bellu Cemetery) is the largest and most famous cemetery in Bucharest, Romania.

It is located on a plot of land donated to the local administration by Baron Barbu Bellu. It has been in use since 1858. The cemetery covers 54 acres and it is one of the most authentic cultural attractions in Bucharest.

Hours 
The cemetery is open every day from 8:30 AM to 8 PM. On public holidays the visiting hours may differ.

Notable interments

A
 Elena Alistar, physician and politician
 Theodor Aman, painter and illustrator
 Ana Aslan, biologist and physician

B
 Aurel Babeș, scientist and physician
 George Bacovia, writer
 Ioan Bălan, bishop
 Leopoldina Bălănuță, actress
 Eugen Barbu, journalist, pamphleteer, polemicist, publicist, novelist, scenarist, and politician
 Tita Bărbulescu, singer
 Ion Barbu, poet and mathematician
 Marga Barbu, actress
 Radu Beligan, actor
 Barbu Bellu, baron, jurist, and politician
 Carol Benesch, architect
 Ion Besoiu, actor
 Andrei Blaier, director and scenarist
 Lucian Bolcaș, lawyer and politician
 Emil Botta, actor and writer
 Dimitrie Brândză, botanist
 Ioan Alexandru Brătescu-Voinești, writer
 Theodor Burghele, surgeon and academic

C
 Eusebiu Camilar, writer and translator
 Șerban Cantacuzino, actor
 Ion Luca Caragiale, playwright, novelist, pamphleteer, theater director, political commentator and journalist
 Toma Caragiu, actor
 Ion Caramitru, actor
 Jules Cazaban, actor
 Anda Călugăreanu, actress and singer
 Radu Câmpeanu, economist, jurist, and politician
 Constantin Cândea, chemist
 Alexandru Cernat, general and politician
 Maria Cicherschi Ropală, doctor and professor
 Radu Ciuceanu, historian and politician
 Liviu Ciulei, director, actor, scenographer, architect and professor
 Henri Coandă, engineer, physicist, inventor and aviation pioneer
 N. D. Cocea, lawyer, writer, journalist, publicist and politician
 Florin Condurățeanu, journalist
 George Constantin, actor
 Corneliu Coposu, politician and founder of the Christian Democratic National Peasants' Party
 Cornel Ciupercescu, actor
 Pavel Coruț, writer
 Nicolae Corjos, director
 George Coșbuc, poet, literary critic, and translator
 Nicolae Crețulescu, physician and Prime Minister of Romania
 Constantin Cristescu, general
 Sergiu Cunescu, politician

D
 Hariclea Darclée, soprano
 Alexandru Darie, theater director
 Mihail Davidoglu, playwright
 Gheorghe Gheorghiu-Dej, President of the State Council
 Anghel Demetriescu, historian and writer
 Ovid Densusianu, philologist, linguist, folklorist, literary historian and poet
 Dan Deșliu, poet
 Ion Diaconescu, politician and anticommunist activist
 Gheorghe Dinică, actor
 Neagu Djuvara, historian
 Ion Dobran, pilot
 Ion Dolănescu, singer
 Felicia Donceanu, composer
 Corneliu Dragalina, general
 Ion Dragalina, general
 Mihai Drăgănescu, engineer

E
 Victor Eftimiu, poet and playwright
 Mihai Eminescu, poet, writer, and journalist
 Paul Everac, playwright

F
 Grigore Filipescu, politician, journalist, and engineer
 Eugen Filotti, diplomat, publicist, and writer
 Mihai Fotino, actor

G
 Vladimir Găitan, actor
 Emil Gârleanu, writer, director, scenarist, and journalist
 Nicholas Georgescu-Roegen, mathematician, statistician, teacher, and economist
 Evlogi and Hristo Georgiev
 Radu Greceanu, chronicler

H
 Spiru Haret, mathematician, astronomer, and teacher
 Iulia Hasdeu, poet
 Ignacio Hidalgo de Cisneros, Spanish military aviator (in 1994 his remains moved to Spain)
 Nicolae Hortolomei, surgeon
 Emil Hossu, actor
 Iuliu Hossu, bishop, political prisoner and cardinal
 Dragomir Hurmuzescu, physicist and academic

I
 Alexandru Ionescu, (socialist militant)
 Nae Ionescu, philosopher, logician, teacher, and journalist
 Șerban Ionescu, actor
 Iorgu Iordan, linguist, philologist, and communist politician
 Nicolae Iorga, historian, literary critic, librarian, playwright, poet, encyclopedist, memoirist and Prime Minister of Romania
 Antonie Iorgovan, jurist, professor, and politician
 Ștefan Octavian Iosif, poet and translator
 Petre Ispirescu, editor, folklorist, storyteller, writer and typographer
 Constantin Istrati, chemist, president of the Romanian Academy
 Panait Istrati, writer

K
 Alexandru Kirițescu, playwright

L
 Nicolae Labiș, poet
 Iacob Lahovary, general and politician
 Constantin Lecca, painter and drawing teacher
 Ștefan Luchian, painter

M
 Alexandru Macedonski, poet, writer, playwright, and publicist
 George Magheru, poet and playwright
 Titu Maiorescu, lawyer, writer, philosopher, founder of Junimea and Prime Minister of Romania
 Mircea Malița, mathematician, diplomat, essayist
 Viorel Mărginean, painter
 Manea Mănescu, Prime Minister
 Radu Manicatide, engineer and aircraft constructor
 Lia Manoliu, Olympic athlete
 Ștefania Mărăcineanu, physicist
 Gabriel Marinescu, general and politician
 Cornel Medrea, sculptor
 Ioan Luchian Mihalea, composer, conductor and television host
 Matei Millo, actor
 Mina Minovici, forensic scientist
 Ion Minulescu, poet and writer
 Angela Moldovan, singer
 Ovidiu Iuliu Moldovan, actor
 Traian Moșoiu, general
 Tudor Mușatescu, poet, writer, playwright and humorist

N
 Mircea Nedelciu, writer

O
 Alexandru Odobescu, writer, archaeologist and politician

P
 Dimitrie Paciurea, sculptor
 Zenovie Pâclișanu, historian, diplomat and cleric
 Theodor Pallady, painter
 Gherman Pântea, soldier and politician
 Hortensia Papadat-Bengescu, writer and novelist
 Anca Parghel, jazz singer and teacher
 Vasile Pârvan, historian and archaeologist
 Dinu Patriciu, billionaire businessman and politician
 Ivan Patzaichin, canoeist
 Adrian Păunescu, writer, literary critic, essayist, poet, publicist, translator and politician
 Amza Pellea, actor
 Milița Petrașcu, portrait artist and sculptor
 Camil Petrescu, novelist, playwright, philosopher and poet
 Cezar Petrescu, novelist, translator and journalist
 Gică Petrescu, singer and composer
 Adrian Pintea, actor
 Florian Pittiș, actor, director, translator and folk singer
 Mitică Popescu, actor
 David Praporgescu, general
 Marin Preda, academician, novelist, writer and communist deputy in the Great National Assembly
 George Pruteanu, literary critic and politician

R
 Elie Radu, civil engineer and academic
 Ioana Radu, singer
 Dem Rădulescu, actor and professor
 Constantin Rădulescu-Motru, philosopher, psychologist, teacher, politician, playwright and theater director
 Colea Răutu, actor
 Liviu Rebreanu, writer and playwright
 C. A. Rosetti, politician, publicist and leader of the Wallachian Revolution of 1848
 Radu R. Rosetti, general, military historian, and librarian

S
 Ion Marin Sadoveanu, playwright
 Mihail Sadoveanu, writer, storyteller, novelist, academician, and politician
 Constantin Sănătescu, general and Prime Minister of Romania
 Eugen Simion, literary critic, historian, and academician
 Anastase Simu, art collector
 Toma N. Socolescu, architect
 Toma T. Socolescu, architect
 Ion N. Socolescu, architect
 Toma Barbu Socolescu, architect
 Dan Spătaru, singer
 Cristina Stamate, actress
 Zaharia Stancu, writer, poet, novelist, theater director, journalist, and publicist
 Nichita Stănescu, poet, writer, essayist
 Tatiana Stepa, folk singer
 Valeriu Sterian, musician, singer and composer
 Laura Stoica, singer, composer and actress

T
 Constantin Tănase, actor
 Maria Tănase, singer
 Octavian Codru Tăslăuanu, magazine publisher and politician
 Ionel Teodoreanu, novelist and lawyer
 Gheorghe Țițeica, mathematician
 Șerban Țițeica, quantum physicist

U
 Mihaela Ursuleasa, pianist

V
 Radu Vasile, historian and Prime Minister of Romania
 Grigore Vasiliu Birlic, actor
 Iancu Văcărescu, poet
 Iulian Vesper, poet and prose writer
 Tudor Vianu, esthetician, literary critic and historian, poet, essayist, philosopher, and translator
 Aurel Vlaicu, engineer, inventor, and aviation pioneer
 Alexandru Vlahuță, writer
 Alice Voinescu, writer, academic, translator
 Gheorghe Vrănceanu, mathematician
 Traian Vuia, inventor and aviation pioneer

X
 A. D. Xenopol, academician, historian, philosopher, economist, teacher, sociologist, and writer

Z
 Camelia Zorlescu, actress

Gallery

References

Cemeteries in Bucharest
Eastern Orthodox cemeteries
Tourist attractions in Bucharest
1858 establishments in Wallachia
Historic monuments in Bucharest